The Springvale Botanical Cemetery is the largest crematorium and memorial park in Victoria, Australia. It is located in Springvale, in the south-eastern suburbs of Melbourne.

History
Originally known as The Necropolis Springvale, the cemetery commenced operations in 1901. Between 1904 and 1952 it was served by its own railway branch line and station, by which coffins, passengers and staff were conveyed to the cemetery. The first cremation took place at Springvale in April 1905. According to the Southern Metropolitan Cemeteries Trust, here have been approximately 473,000 cremations and 162,000 burials at the Springvale Botanical  Cemetery.

In 2006, the cemetery was renamed the Springvale Botanical Cemetery to reflect its increasing botanical significance, which includes original plantings of two bunya-bunya pines, palms and gums. It is now administered by the Southern Metropolitan Cemeteries Trust (SMCT), which manages nine cemeteries in all, including the Melbourne General Cemetery, St Kilda Cemetery and Dandenong Community Cemetery.

Notable interments

 Frank Bladin (1898–1978), RAAF commander
 Scobie Breasley (1914–2006),  champion jockey
 A.R. Chisholm (1888–1981), French language scholar
 Sir Zelman Cowen (1919–2011), Governor-General
 Cyril Clowes (1892–1968), soldier
 Erle Cox (1873–1950), author
 Frank Crean (1916–2008), Deputy Prime Minister
 Bernard Cronin (1884–1968), author
 Judith Durham (1943–2022), singer, songwriter
 Jack Dyer (1913–2003), footballer
 James Fowler (1863–1940), politician, author
 Cathy Godbold (1974–2018), actress
 Robert Grieve VC (1889–1957), soldier
 Charles Hegyalji (1956–1998), gangster
 Walter Hume (1873–1943), inventor, concrete pipe developer
 Richard Kelliher VC (1910–1963), soldier
 Jack Little (1908–1986), media personality
 Rosemary Margan (1937–2017), radio and television personality
 John McEwen (1900–1980), Prime Minister
 Bert Newton (1938–2021) TV and radio presenter, entertainer and actor
 Bess Norriss (1878–1939), artist
 Horace Petty (1904–1982), politician
 Dorothy Porter (1954–2008), poet
 Julia Rapke (1886–1959), women's rights activist
 Macpherson Robertson (1859–1945), chocolate manufacturer, philanthropist
 John Ryan VC (1890–1941), soldier
 Reginald Sholl (1902–1988), Supreme Court justice, diplomat
 Billy Snedden (1926–1987), politician
 Charles Tait (1868–1933), film maker, theatrical entrepreneur
 Bud Tingwell (1923–2009), actor
 Fannie Eleanor Williams (1884–1963), scientist
 Kath Williams (1895–1975), trade unionist, equal pay campaigner
 Tommy Woodcock (1905–1985), Phar Lap's handler
 Bill Woodfull (1897–1965), cricketer
 Tracy Pew (1957–1986), musician
 Henry Wynter (1886–1945), soldier
 Ethel Tracy Richardson (1877–1942), nursing sister, army matron-in-chief, and honorary major

War graves
The Botanical Cemetery contains the war graves of 146 Commonwealth service personnel, nearly 50 from World War I and nearly 100 from World War II. In addition the Commonwealth War Graves Commission (CWGC) also commemorates 67 Commonwealth service personnel cremated at Springvale Crematorium whose ashes remain here.

Springvale War Cemetery
Within two acres of the Botanical Cemetery, beyond the crematorium, lies the CWGC's Springvale War Cemetery, created in World War II, where there are buried 607 Commonwealth service personnel and 4 Dutch personnel. It contains a Cross of Sacrifice unveiled in 1948.  In the form of bronze plaques, on the rear wall of the shelter behind the Cross, is the Victoria Cremation Memorial to 75 Commonwealth service personnel who were cremated within the State of Victoria but whose ashes were disposed of where a memorial could not be sited.

See also
 Luciano Rossetti Mausoleum

References

Further reading
 Chambers, D (2001) City of the Dead: A History of The Necropolis, Springvale, Flemington Vic: Hyland House

External links 
 Springvale Botanical Cemetery website
 Springvale Botanical Cemetery – Billion Graves

1901 establishments in Australia
Cemeteries in Melbourne
Buildings and structures in the City of Greater Dandenong